Philipp Friedrich Gmelin (19 August 1721 – 9 May 1768) was a professor of botany and chemistry. He studied the chemistry of antimony and wrote texts on the pancreatic ducts, mineral waters, and botany.

He was a brother of the famous traveler Johann Georg Gmelin. He obtained his Master's degree in 1742 at the University of Tübingen under Burchard Mauchart.

He was elected a Fellow of the Royal Society in 1758.

He was the father of the naturalist Johann Friedrich Gmelin.

Works

Notes

References
 J. Chem. Educ., 1954, 32, pp. 534–541.
 Chem. Ber., 1939, 72, pp. 5A-33A.
 , Urban & Schwarzenberg, 1962, vol. 2, p. 776.
 , Delagrabe, 1843–1865, vol. 16, p. 646.
 , C. L. F. Panckoucke, 1820–1822, vol. 4, pp. 461–462.

External links
Philipp Friedrich Gmelin at EconomyPoint.org
Philipp Friedrich Gmelin at OpenLibrary.org 

1721 births
1768 deaths
University of Tübingen alumni
Academic staff of the University of Tübingen
18th-century German botanists
18th-century German chemists
Fellows of the Royal Society